No One Would Tell is a 2018 film that aired on Lifetime and is a true-story remake of the 1996 film of the same name. It features Shannen Doherty, Matreya Scarrwener, Callan Potter, Chanelle Peloso, Louriza Tronco, Trezzo Mahoro, Ricky He, Sarah Grey, Avery Konrad, Ona Grauer, and Mira Sorvino.

The plot differs from the original film, but both are based on the true story of Jamie Fuller, a 16-year-old high school student who murdered his 14-year-old girlfriend, Amy Carnevale, on August 23, 1991, in Beverly, Massachusetts.

Plot

Sarah Collins (Matreya Scarrwener) and her best friend  Nikki Farrow (Chanelle Peloso), attend a wrestling match at their school. There, Sarah unexpectedly catches the attention of a wrestler and fellow student, Rob Tennison (Callan Potter). He is a charismatic, newer student and star wrestler. Sarah is pleasantly surprised to find out that he shows romantic interest in her as well, and they start dating.

Before long, Rob starts becoming jealous and controlling of Sarah. At one point during a get-together at his family lake house, Sarah's friends pressure her into reading a poem that he had texted her, which angers him. He takes her cell phone outside, and when she follows him, he throws it at her in anger, breaking it. He apologizes, reminds her of how much he loves her, offers to buy her a new cell phone, and they make up. Nikki comes outside and from a distance, sees a girl living next door. They wave at each other, but the girl appears to get scared after seeing Rob behind Nikki. This leaves her confused.

Rob buys Sarah a new cell phone as promised, setting up a photo of him as the lock-screen. After school, he calls her as she is studying for a test in her bedroom. For that reason, she tells him she can't talk at the moment. However, after they hang up, Nikki calls her, needing a place to get away from her alcoholic mother. Rob finds out and gets angry at Sarah, accusing her of lying to him and that Nikki was more important than him. Nikki overhears the fight and calls his friend, Gus (Ricky He), to ask about the girl she saw next door to his family lake house. Gus tells her that they had dated the previous summer, then asks her why she wants to know. She asks him to trust her for a while, and tells him that she'll talk to him about it later.

Sarah talks with her mother, Laura (Shannen Doherty), about her relationship with Rob. Laura, who has her own history of rocky ones, thinks he is jealous but speculates that maybe he just doesn't want to lose Sarah. Later that night, he arrives at their house with an expensive dress he bought for Sarah for the upcoming school dance. When Laura tells him of her talk with Sarah, he insists that there is nothing Sarah could do that would change how he feels about her. In her room, he convinces her to try the dress on and then, when the zipper won't zip, he suggests to her that she can "lose the weight" before the dance.

At school in the girls' bathroom with Alexa (Louriza Tronco), Sarah is trying on an off-the-shoulder sweater and tight miniskirt. She is pleased and surprised that it fits, and likes how pretty she looks. Alexa notices bruising on her shoulder, but then instead of asking her about it, only helps her cover it with makeup and hide it with her hair. She takes a selfie in the outfit and posts it online. This angers Rob, who loudly and publicly shames her in the hallway, telling her she looks like a "cheap slut".

Later, thinking Rob's parents are away, Sarah goes to his house to apologize. She is surprised to be greeted by his mother (Ona Grauer), whom she never met. He turns the situation around on her, claiming she intentionally planned her visit as a way of meeting his mother. He angrily declares it "wasn't the right time", and when she leaves, he follows her outside. The situation escalates as he accuses her of always nagging him, after which he punches her so hard that she falls to the ground, injured. Stunned and upset, she breaks up with him and runs away, telling him not to contact her.

When she arrives home, Sarah finds Laura silent on the couch. She hides her injuries as Laura informs her that her own boyfriend just broke up with her. Just as it looks like Sarah might open up to her, she takes a phone call from work and Sarah storms off to her room. When Laura comes in, she notices Sarah's injuries. She lies, saying she fell and "Rob wasn't even there", then verbally takes her frustration out on Laura. Later that day, Rob promises to stop abusing her, and they get back together. He gives her a ring, making her promise that they will be together forever.

When Sarah tells Nikki that she and Rob broke up and got back together, Nikki says that he's not going to change. Sarah accuses her of betrayal, and walks off to be with him. Upset and confused, Nikki seeks out the ex-girlfriend she'd seen earlier at Rob's family lake house, hoping to get information and advice. When they meet, she describes to Nikki the abuse she suffered at his hands. She tells Nikki she stopped talking to him altogether, but never reported it because she didn't want to be "that girl" and that "it's not a good look" to stay with a guy who was abusing her. Nikki asks her how she can help Sarah, and she advises her just to be there for Sarah, no matter who she dates.

At the dance, Nikki sees Sarah for the first time since their fight and apologizes to her. She gladly accepts and apologizes too. On the dance floor, when Rob notices her speaking and laughing with another boy, he pushes him and then drags her outside. Nikki and Gus follow them to the parking lot and intervene, so that he can't hurt her again. With Nikki's support, she finally decides she has had enough of his abuse, and breaks up with him.

In the days that follow, Sarah ignores Rob's attempts to contact her. He finally tricks her into talking to him by having Jacqueline (Sarah Grey) convince her to do so. She reluctantly agrees to let him give her a ride home, and only to tell him it's really over and that she is done. She gets into his car to discover a drunken, passed-out Zack (Trezzo Mahoro) in the back seat. Rather than taking her home, he tells her that he's taking her for a drive.

The next day, Sarah's friends and family are alarmed to discover that she is missing. Zack tells Nikki he doesn't know what happened to her, because he was passed out in the back seat of Rob's car. He says that when he asked Rob about it, he claimed that they dropped her off at home, but Zack noticed that her purse was still in the car. Nikki immediately calls Laura to let her know, and she tells her Rob is there with her. Nikki then tells her about his abuse toward Sarah. Shaking, she hangs up and questions him, revealing that she knows about the abuse. When he denies it, she angrily tells him to leave. She and Nikki go to Rob's family lake house, where they find Sarah's ring. A police search team is sent into the lake, where they find her body.

As Rob is arrested by the police and charged with first degree of murder, his mother calls his father about needing a lawyer for him. At the trial (used as the framing wraparound for the film), Judge Elizabeth Hanover (Mira Sorvino) presides over the different testimonies. On the stand, Laura firmly tells Nikki that what happened to Sarah was not her fault, and tells the court that they should be looking at Rob's actions. A flashback to the night of the murder reveals that he accidentally asphyxiated her.

Judge Hanover reads the guilty verdict and then tells the witnesses to tell someone next time they see a friend being abused instead of standing by and doing nothing, implying how it could have saved Sarah from getting killed by quoting "Between the years 2001 and 2012, we lost 6,488 souls in battles fought in Iraq and Afghanistan. But during that same time period, 11,766 women were killed, but by their own partners. This is a war that we, in this country, refuse to address. It has to stop because things have gotten so dire that this is what a victory looks like; and I am sorry, folks, but today was no victory. This case should not be closed, because when it comes to domestic violence, there needs to be change on a cultural level, and that change needs to start with each and every one of you."

At school, a memorial for Sarah is created in the hallway, where friends leave photos, flowers, and mementos. Back at home in her room, Nikki and Laura mourn her death and console one another.

A postscript gives advice to people on what to do if they see domestic violence on anyone.

Cast
 Shannen Doherty as Laura Collins
 Matreya Scarrwener as Sarah Collins
 Callan Potter as Rob Tennison
 Chanelle Peloso as Nikki Farrow
 Louriza Tronco as Alexa
 Trezzo Mahoro as Zack
 Ricky He as Gus
 Sarah Grey as Jacqueline
 Avery Konrad as Kara Lovett
 Brendan O'Brien as Mr. Tennison
 Ona Grauer as Mrs. Tennison
 Mira Sorvino as Judge Elizabeth Hanover
 Bob Frazer as Prosecutor
 Garfield Wilson as Detective Anderson

Production
Danielle von Zerneck, Lisa Richardson, and Martin Fisher served as executive producers with Canadians Shawn Angelski and Paddy Bickerton serving as producers on the film. Gail Harvey directed from a script written by Caitlin D. Fryers.

Lifetime announced the film as part of a fall movie lineup focused on young adults, and tackling a number of social and mental health issues. The announced cast included Shannen Doherty as "Laura" Collins, Matreya Scarrwener as "Sarah" Collins, and Callan Potter as "Rob" Tennison.

Reception
As a remake of the 1996 film, the film was fairly well-received, ranking ninth out of the Top 150 cable shows when it premiered on Sunday, September 16, 2018.

References

External links
 No One Would Tell at Lifetime
 
 

Lifetime (TV network) films
2018 television films
2018 crime drama films
2010s teen drama films
American crime drama films
American teen drama films
Films about domestic violence
Drama films based on actual events
Films about murderers
2018 films
American drama television films
2010s English-language films
2010s American films